John McEnroe was the defending champion, but did not participate this year.

Ivan Lendl won the tournament, beating Joakim Nyström in the final, 6–2, 6–2, 6–4.

Seeds

  Ivan Lendl (champion)
  Joakim Nyström (final)
  Anders Järryd (semifinals)
  Miloslav Mečíř (semifinals)
  Henrik Sundström (first round)
  Tomáš Šmíd (first round)
  Jakob Hlasek (quarterfinals)
  Jan Gunnarsson (second round)

Draw

Finals

Top half

Bottom half

External links
 Main draw

Milan Indoor
1986 Grand Prix (tennis)
Milan